Kyle Hakeem Edwards (born 17 February 1998) is a professional footballer who plays for EFL League One club Ipswich Town as a winger.

Edwards began his career with West Bromwich Albion, joining the club's academy at the age of six. He made his senior professional debut in September 2017 while on loan at EFL League Two side Exeter City. He made his senior debut for West Brom in August of the following season. During the 2019–20 season, Edwards helped West Brom win promotion from the EFL Championship following a second-placed league finish. He made his Premier League debut in September 2020. He left West Brom in July 2021 following the expiry of his contract. In August 2021, Edwards joined Ipswich Town on a free transfer.

He has represented England at U16, U17 and U20 levels.

Club career

West Bromwich Albion
Edwards graduated from the youth academy of West Bromwich Albion, after having joined the setup at the age of six. In September 2015, he was an unused substitute in a Football League Cup match against Norwich City. In September 2017, he was nominated for the Premier League 2 Player of the Month Award for the month of August.

Exeter City (loan)
On 31 August 2017, Edwards joined EFL League Two club Exeter City on loan until January 2018. He joined Kane Wilson, another loanee from West Brom. The club's assistant manager Matt Oakley commented that he would "add a real strength in depth to our squad". He made his senior debut in a 0–3 defeat against Notts County on 26 September. On 4 October 2017, he scored his first senior goal in a Football League Trophy match against Plymouth Argyle, a match which ended 2–2. In January, Edwards' loan spell was extended until the end of the 2017–18 season. He helped Exeter reach the 2018 EFL League Two play-off Final against Coventry City following a 4th placed league finish. During the play-off final, Edwards came off the bench to score a consolation goal as Exeter lost 1–3 to Coventry at Wembley Stadium. Edwards made 28 appearances for Exeter during his loan spell, scoring twice.

Return to West Brom
On 26 January 2018, Edwards extended his contract at West Bromwich Albion until 2020. He made his Albion debut as a half-time substitute in the club's 1–0 win against Luton Town in the EFL Cup on 14 August 2018. He scored his first goal for West Brom in his following appearance, netting the winning goal in a 1–0 EFL Cup win against Mansfield Town on 28 August. On 16 March, Edwards scored the winning goal in a 1–0 away win against Brentford. He scored twice in 11 appearances during his first full season in the West Brom first-team, helping the club reach the EFL Championship play-offs.

Edwards scored his first goal of the 2019–20 season in the opening match against Nottingham Forest, with the match finishing in a 2–1 win for West Brom. He managed to feature more regularly during the 2019–20 season, scoring his second goal of the campaign in a 5–1 win against Swansea City on 8 December. Edwards made 30 appearances during the season, 26 of which came in the EFL Championship, helping West Brom win promotion to the Premier League following a second-placed league finish. In May 2020, West Brom took-up the option to extend Edwards' contract by an additional year, keeping him at the club until the summer of 2021.

He made his Premier League debut in a 0–3 defeat against Leicester City on 13 September 2020. He featured infrequently in the West Brom first-team under manager Slaven Bilić during the first-half of the 2020–21 season. He found game time very limited during the second-half of the season, following the arrival of Sam Allardyce, with his only appearance coming in an FA Cup third-round tie against Blackpool on 9 January. He made 8 appearances in all competitions during the season, as West Brom suffered relegation from the Premier League after finishing 19th.

On 27 May 2021 it was announced that he would leave West Bromwich Albion following the conclusion of his contract, thus ending a 17 year spell at the club.

Ipswich Town
Edwards joined Ipswich Town on a free transfer on 9 August 2021, signing a 3-year-deal. He made his debut as a second-half substitute in a 1–2 away loss against Burton Albion on 14 August.

International career
Edwards has represented England at multiple youth team levels. He won 1 cap for the England U16 team in 2013. He  won 3 caps for the England U17 team in 2014. Edwards made his debut for the England U20 team in 2018, going onto win 5 caps between 2018 and 2019. He was a member of the 2019 Toulon Tournament squad.

Style of play
In 2017, Darren Moore (then Professional Development Coach of West Bromwich Albion) described Edwards as an exciting talent with real potential. Moore also said that Edwards was "quick and very direct and has tight ball control. He has the ability to go past people and create things".

Personal life
Following West Brom’s promotion to the Premier League in 2020, Edwards released the rap track ‘Promotion Ting’ via Link Up TV, with the music video amassing over 100,000 views on YouTube.

Career statistics

Honours
West Bromwich Albion
EFL Championship runner-up: 2019–20

References

External links
Kyle Edwards profile at the Ipswich Town F.C. website
England profile at The Football Association

1998 births
Living people
People from Dudley
English footballers
Association football forwards
West Bromwich Albion F.C. players
Exeter City F.C. players
Ipswich Town F.C. players
English Football League players
Premier League players
Black British sportsmen